Monika Woytowicz (born 1944) is a German stage, film and television actress. She studied at the Theaterhochschule Leipzig.

Selected filmography
 Follow Me, Scoundrels (1964)
 The Adventures of Werner Holt (1965)
 Die schwarze Mühle (1975)

References

Bibliography
 Shen, Qinna. The Politics of Magic: DEFA Fairy-Tale Films. Wayne State University Press, 2015.

External links

1944 births
Living people
Theaterhochschule Leipzig alumni
German film actresses
German stage actresses
German television actresses